Stadio Comunale Riva IV is a football stadium in Chiasso, Ticino,  Switzerland. It is the home ground of FC Chiasso and has a capacity of 4,000.

See also 
List of football stadiums in Switzerland

External links 
Official website 

Sports venues in Ticino
Comunale (Chiasso)
FC Chiasso
Chiasso